Alice M. Greenwald is the current President and Chief Executive Officer of the National September 11 Memorial & Museum since January 2017. Greenwald  was previously Director of the Memorial Museum/Executive and Vice President for Exhibitions, Collections and Education at the 9/11 Memorial & Museum from 2006 to 2017. Before joining the 9/11 Memorial & Museum Greenwald was the Associate Museum Director, Museum Programs, at the United States Holocaust Museum in Washington D.C. from 2001 to 2006, having served for the previous 14 years as an expert advisor to the project.

Career

From 1986-2001, Greenwald was the principal of Alice M. Greenwald/Museum Services, providing expertise to various clients including, United States Holocaust Memorial Museum, the Baltimore Museum of Industry, the Pew Charitable Trusts, and the Historical Society of Princeton. Greenwald has served as Executive Director of the National Museum of American Jewish History, Philadelphia (1981–86); Acting Director (1980), Curator (1978–81) and Assistant Curator (1975–78) of the Hebrew Union College Skirball Museum, Los Angeles, and Curatorial Assistant at the Spertus Museum of Judaica, Chicago.

Education

Greenwald has an M.A. in the History of Religions from the University of Chicago Divinity School, and a B.A. with concentrations in English Literature and Anthropology from Sarah Lawrence College.

References

Year of birth missing (living people)
Living people
American women chief executives
Sarah Lawrence College alumni
University of Chicago Divinity School alumni
21st-century American women